Diego Cascón Sandoval (born 7 June 1984) is a Spanish footballer who plays as a forward.

Club career
Cascón was born in León, Castile and León. He spent his first 11 seasons as a senior in Segunda División B, amassing totals of 260 games and 55 goals for Cultural y Deportiva Leonesa, CF Badalona, Polideportivo Ejido, AD Alcorcón – with these two teams, he eliminated Villarreal CF and Real Madrid respectively from the Copa del Rey– SD Eibar and Real Jaén.

Whilst with the latter club, Cascón solicited the services of a sorcerer in April 2013 in an attempt to end a negative scoring drought, feeling he was a victim of the evil eye. He eventually netted eight goals in 31 matches, as the Andalusia side promoted and returned to Segunda División after 11 years.

Cascón made his professional debut on 18 August 2013 at the age of 29, in Jaén's 1–2 home defeat to SD Eibar for the second level season opener. In February of the following year, after only a further ten league appearances and no goals, he moved abroad for the first time, joining a host of compatriots at Kitchee SC in Hong Kong.

On 15 August 2017, Cascón moved to Tercera División club UD Ibiza after stints with Mérida AD and UD Melilla in the tier above.

Club statistics

References

External links

1984 births
Living people
Sportspeople from León, Spain
Spanish footballers
Footballers from Castile and León
Association football forwards
Segunda División players
Segunda División B players
Tercera División players
Cultural Leonesa footballers
CF Badalona players
Polideportivo Ejido footballers
AD Alcorcón footballers
SD Eibar footballers
Real Jaén footballers
UD Melilla footballers
Mérida AD players
UD Ibiza players
Hong Kong First Division League players
Kitchee SC players
Categoría Primera B players
América de Cali footballers
Spanish expatriate footballers
Expatriate footballers in Hong Kong
Expatriate footballers in Colombia
Spanish expatriate sportspeople in Hong Kong